Dophla is a genus of butterflies in the family Nymphalidae (Limenitidinae)

Species
Dophla evelina (Stoll, [1790])
Dophla pulchella C.L. Lee, 1979 (Tibet)

References

"Dophla Moore, [1880]" at Markku Savela's Lepidoptera and Some Other Life Forms

Limenitidinae
Nymphalidae genera
Taxa named by Frederic Moore